is a former Japanese football player.

Club statistics

References

External links

library.footballjapan.jp

1983 births
Living people
Juntendo University alumni
Association football people from Ōita Prefecture
Japanese footballers
J1 League players
Japan Football League players
Nagoya Grampus players
Fagiano Okayama players
Verspah Oita players
Association football forwards